Yaylabeyi is a village in the District of Haymana, Ankara Province, Turkey. Its old name was Abdülkerim. The neighbouring settlements are: Turkserefli in the north, Durutlar in the east, Turkhuyuk in the south and Polatlı in the west.

The village is populated by Kurds.

Population

References

Villages in Haymana District
Kurdish settlements in Ankara Province